Isaac Bradley Humphries (born 5 January 1998) is an Australian professional basketball player for Melbourne United of the National Basketball League (NBL). He played college basketball for the Kentucky Wildcats.

Early life
Born in the Sydney suburb of Caringbah, Humphries grew up in Cronulla and started playing basketball at the age of 12. He had earlier played rugby league. In 2010, he spent six months in Hamilton, Ontario, Canada. "I had a pretty big growth spurt when I lived in Canada", he told theleader.com.au in January 2014.

College career
Humphries attended Scots College in Sydney and the Australian Institute of Sport in Canberra before taking his game to the United States in December 2014 to play prep ball at La Lumiere School in La Porte, Indiana. Humphries enrolled at the University of Kentucky in 2015 and saw action in 23 games as a freshman. Coming off the bench in all but one game, he averaged 1.9 points and 2.4 rebounds in 9.1 minutes per contest.

In the 2016–17 campaign, Humphries appeared in 38 games for the Wildcats with one start, producing averages of 2.8 points and 2.8 boards per outing in 8.3 minutes a game. He scored a career-high 12 points in his last college game, Kentucky’s 73-75 loss to the North Carolina Tar Heels in the South Region finals where he was also named in the NCAA All-Regional tournament team.

In April 2017, Humphries declared for the NBA draft, forgoing his final two years of college eligibility.

Professional career

Sydney Kings (2017–2018)
Opting to turn professional, Humphries worked out with several NBA franchises over the summer, including the Washington Wizards, after going undrafted in the 2017 NBA draft. Humphries returned to Australia and signed with his hometown team the Sydney Kings on 27 July 2017 for the 2017–18 NBL season. With the Kings, Humphries averaged 6.9 points, 3.6 rebounds and 1.0 blocks while shooting 58 percent in 16 minutes per game, making six starts in 26 appearances. He was subsequently named the NBL Rookie of the Year.

FMP Beograd (2018)
On 27 February 2018, Humphries agreed to a deal with FMP of the Basketball League of Serbia.

Erie BayHawks (2018–2019)
On 8 October 2018, Humphries signed a training camp deal with the Atlanta Hawks, but was waived the next day. He subsequently joined the Erie BayHawks for the 2018–19 NBA G League season.

Atlanta Hawks (2019) 
On 1 April 2019, Humphries signed with Atlanta for the remainder of 2018–19 NBA season.

Humphries joined the Los Angeles Clippers for the 2019 NBA Summer League in Las Vegas.

Lakeland Magic (2019–2020)
On 24 September 2019, Humphries signed with the Orlando Magic. He was waived and assigned to the Lakeland Magic. Humphries averaged 8.8 points, 5.9 rebounds, and 1.6 blocks per game during the 2019–20 season.

Adelaide 36ers (2020–2022)
On 16 July 2020, Humphries signed a two-year deal to return to the NBL with the Adelaide 36ers. He averaged 13.3 points, 7.1 rebounds, and a league-leading 2.8 blocks per game during the 2020–21 season. His mutual option for a second season with the 36ers was not exercised.

On 9 July 2021, Humphries re-signed with the 36ers for the 2021–22 NBL season. He played just six matches, averaging 7.7 points in 17.7 minutes per game, before a knee injury ruled him out for the season in February 2022.

Melbourne United (2022–present)
On 22 July 2022, Humphries signed with Melbourne United for the 2022–23 NBL season.

National team career
Humphries made his debut for the Australian junior national team at the 2013 FIBA Oceania Under-16 Championship. In 2014, he helped Australia win the silver medal at the FIBA Under-17 World Championship, averaging 18.9 points, 11.6 rebounds and 3.3 blocks per game during the tournament. He was named to the All-Tournament Team. Humphries made his senior debut for the Australian national team in a 2019 FIBA World Cup qualifying match against Kazakhstan, where he recorded 17 points and 7 rebounds in a dominant performance.

Career statistics

NBA

Regular season

|-
| style="text-align:left;"| 
| style="text-align:left;"| Atlanta
| 5 || 1 || 11.2 || .286 || .273 || – || 2.2 || .0 || .2 || .0 || 3.0
|- class="sortbottom"
| style="text-align:center;" colspan="2"| Career
| 5 || 1 || 11.2 || .286 || .273 || – || 2.2 || .0 || .2 || .0 || 3.0

NBA G League

Regular season

|-
| style="text-align:left;"| 2018–19
| style="text-align:left;"| Erie
| 46 || 34 || 21.8 || .538 || .337 || .662 || 7.0 || 1.0 || .8 || 1.0 || 11.3
|- class="sortbottom"
| style="text-align:center;" colspan="2"| Career
| 46 || 34 || 21.8 || .538 || .337 || .662 || 7.0 || 1.0 || .8 || 1.0 || 11.3

NBL

|-
| style="text-align:left;"| 2017–18
| style="text-align:left;"| Sydney
| 26 || 6 || 16.5 || .583 || .000 || .653 || 3.7 || .8 || .7 || 1.0 || 6.9
|- class="sortbottom"
| style="text-align:center;" colspan="2"| Career
| 26 || 6 || 16.5 || .583 || .000 || .653 || 3.7 || .8 || .7 || 1.0 || 6.9

College

|-
| style="text-align:left;"| 2015–16
| style="text-align:left;"| Kentucky
| 23 || 1 || 9.1 || .390 || – || .733 || 2.4 || .1 || .1 || .7 || 1.9
|-
| style="text-align:left;"| 2016–17
| style="text-align:left;"| Kentucky
| 38 || 1 || 8.3 || .511 || – || .600 || 2.8 || .2 || .2 || .5 || 2.8
|- class="sortbottom"
| style="text-align:center;" colspan="2"| Career
| 61 || 2 || 8.6 || .473 || – || .650 || 2.7 || .2 || .2 || .6 || 2.4

Personal life
On 16 November 2022, Humphries came out as gay. The announcement saw Humphries become the only active openly gay male professional basketball player in a top tier league anywhere in the world. He also became the first ever Australian male basketball player and first player in the NBL to be openly gay. He said that he had struggled with his sexuality and contemplated suicide, but ultimately decided that he would be happier to be open about it with his teammates.

See also
 List of foreign basketball players in Serbia

References

External links

 Kentucky Wildcats bio
 Isaac Humphries at fiba.com

1998 births
20th-century LGBT people
21st-century LGBT people
Living people
Adelaide 36ers players
Atlanta Hawks players
Australian expatriate basketball people in Serbia
Australian expatriate basketball people in the United States
Australian men's basketball players
Basketball League of Serbia players
Basketball players from Sydney
Centers (basketball)
Erie BayHawks (2017–2019) players
Gay sportsmen
Kentucky Wildcats men's basketball players
KK FMP players
La Lumiere School alumni
Lakeland Magic players
Melbourne United players
National Basketball Association players from Australia
People from the Sutherland Shire
Power forwards (basketball)
Sydney Kings players
Undrafted National Basketball Association players
LGBT basketball players